Paris Donald Gee (born July 5, 1994) is a Canadian professional soccer player who plays as a defender for York United in the Canadian Premier League.

Early life
Gee played youth soccer with Burnaby Selects SC and was named to the U16 British Columbia provincial team in 2010. He later played with Mountain United FC and Coquitlam Metro-Ford SC. and the Vancouver Whitecaps Academy. He also played with Croatia SC Vancouver at senior adult amateur level, helping them win the BC Provincial Cup in 2014.

University career
In 2012, Gee began attending Simon Fraser University and joined the men's soccer team. However, he redshirted the season and did not play.

Club career
Gee began his professional career in Croatia with NK Rudeš in the Croatian third tier. 

In March 2017, Gee signed with United Soccer League club Tulsa Roughnecks. He made his debut on March 25, 2017 as a 74th-minute substitute in a 4–1 win over Colorado Springs Switchbacks, however, it was later ruled that Gee had been ineligible to play in the match, as his signing had not been officially processed by the league, resulting in the league overturning the match, resulting in a 3-0 forfeit loss for Tulsa. He scored his first goal for the club on October 21, 2017, in Tulsa's first ever playoff game, in a 2-1 defeat to San Antonio FC. After the season, Gee would re-sign with the club for the 2018 season.

Gee joined Saint Louis FC in the USL Championship on December 29, 2018, ahead of their 2019 season. Gee would return to the club for a second season in 2020. With St. Louis City SC starting play in MLS in 2023, Saint Louis FC would fold at the end of the 2020 season, ending Gee's time at the club after two seasons.

In December 2020, Gee signed with FC Edmonton of the Canadian Premier League for the 2021 season. He made his debut in the season opener on June 26 against Atlético Ottawa.

In July 2022, he signed with York United of the Canadian Premier League for the remainder of the 2022 season. In December 2022, he re-signed with the club for the 2023 season, with a club option for 2024.

References

External links
 

1994 births
Living people
Association football midfielders
Canadian soccer players
Sportspeople from Burnaby
Soccer people from British Columbia
Canadian expatriate soccer players
Expatriate footballers in Croatia
Canadian expatriate sportspeople in Croatia
Expatriate soccer players in the United States
Canadian expatriate sportspeople in the United States
Simon Fraser Clan men's soccer players
NK Rudeš players
FC Tulsa players
Saint Louis FC players
FC Edmonton players
First Football League (Croatia) players
USL Championship players
Canadian Premier League players
York United FC players